Green Grow the Rushes may refer to:

 "Green Grow the Rushes, O", a folksong
 Green Grow the Rushes (novel), a 1949 novel by Howard Clewes
 Green Grow the Rushes (film), a 1951 film based on the novel
 "Green Grow the Rushes", a song by R.E.M. from the 1985 album Fables of the Reconstruction

See also
 Green Grow the Rashes, a 1783 song by Scottish poet Robert Burns